Clay County Schools is the operating school district for Clay County, West Virginia. The board office is located in the town of Clay.

Board of Education

The Clay County Board of Education is placed in charge of school affairs for Clay County, consisting of the following elected members:
Phoebe Nichols, President
Brooke Jones, Vice President
Lolita Nutter
Susan Bodkins
David Pierson

Schools

High schools
Clay County High School, Clay

Middle schools
Clay Middle School, Clay

Elementary schools
Clay Elementary School, Clay
Lizemore Elementary School, Lizemore
H.E White Elementary, Bomont
Big Otter Elementary, Duck

Former Schools
Ivydale Elementary School
Valley Fork Elementary

References

External links
Official Website

Clay County, West Virginia
School_districts_in_West_Virginia
West_Virginia_school_stubs